Factual relativism (also called epistemic relativism, epistemological relativism, alethic relativism or cognitive relativism) argues that truth itself is relative. This form of relativism has its own particular problem, regardless of whether one is talking about truth being relative to the individual, the position or purpose of the individual, or the conceptual scheme within which the truth was revealed. This problem centers on what Maurice Mandelbaum in 1962 termed the "self-excepting fallacy." Largely because of the self-excepting fallacy, few authors in the philosophy of science currently accept alethic cognitive relativism. Factual relativism is a way to reason where facts used to justify any claims are understood to be relative and subjective to the perspective of those proving or falsifying the proposition.

Viewpoints
One school of thought compares scientific knowledge to the mythology of other cultures, arguing that it is merely our society's set of myths based on societal assumptions. For support, Paul Feyerabend's comments in Against Method that "The similarities between science and myth are indeed astonishing" and "First-world science is one science among many" (from the introduction to the Chinese edition) are sometimes cited, although it is not clear if Feyerabend meant them to be taken entirely seriously.

The strong program in the sociology of science is (in the words of founder David Bloor) "impartial with respect to truth and falsity". Elsewhere, Bloor and Barry Barnes have said "For the relativist [such as us] there is no sense attached to the idea that some standards or beliefs are really rational as distinct from merely locally accepted as such." In France, Bruno Latour has claimed that "Since the settlement of a controversy is the cause of Nature's representation, not the consequence, we can never use the outcome – Nature – to explain how and why a controversy has been settled."

Yves Winkin, a Belgian professor of communications, responded to a popular trial in which two witnesses gave contradicting testimony by telling the newspaper Le Soir that "There is no transcendent truth. [...] It is not surprising that these two people, representing two very different professional universes, should each set forth a different truth. Having said that, I think that, in this context of public responsibility, the commission can only proceed as it does."

The philosopher of science Gérard Fourez wrote that "What one generally calls a fact is an interpretation of a situation that no one, at least for the moment, wants to call into question."

British archaeologist Roger Anyon told The New York Times that "science is just one of many ways of knowing the world...  The Zuni's world view is just as valid as the archeological viewpoint of what prehistory is about."

The Stanford Encyclopedia of Philosophy summarizes that "Relativism has been, in its various guises, both one of the most popular and most reviled philosophical doctrines of our time. Defenders see it as a harbinger of tolerance and the only ethical and epistemic stance worthy of the open-minded and tolerant. Detractors dismiss it for its alleged incoherence and uncritical intellectual permissiveness."

Related views and criticism 

Larry Laudan's book Science and Relativism outlines the various philosophical points of view on the subject in the form of a dialogue.

Cognitive relativism has been criticized by both analytic philosophers and scientists.

See also 
 Aesthetic relativism
 Alternative facts
 Cultural relativism
 Moral relativism

Notes

References
 Maria Baghramian, Relativism, London: Routledge, 2004, 
 Ernest Gellner, Relativism and the Social Sciences, Cambridge University Press, 1985, 
 Nelson Goodman, Ways of Worldmaking. Indianapolis: Hackett, 1978, Paperback 
 Martin Hollis, Steven Lukes, Rationality and Relativism, Oxford: Basil Blackwell, 1982, 
 Jack W. Meiland, Michael Krausz, Relativism, Cognitive and Moral, Notre Dame: University of Notre Dame Press, 1982, 
 Diederick Raven, Lieteke van Vucht Tijssen, Jan de Wolf, Cognitive Relativism and Social Science, 1992, 
 Markus Seidel, Epistemic Relativism: A Constructive Critique, Basingstoke: Palgrave Macmillan, 2014,

External links
 
 

 Westacott, E. Cognitive Relativism, 2006, Internet Encyclopedia of Philosophy
 Westacott, E. Relativism, 2005, Internet Encyclopedia of Philosophy

Relativism
Epistemological theories
Social epistemology
Internalism and externalism